Agh Qeshlaq (also Romanized as Āgh Qeshlāq) is a village in Garamduz Rural District, Garamduz District, Khoda Afarin County, East Azerbaijan Province, Iran. At the 2006 census, its population was 62, in 12 families.

References 

Populated places in Khoda Afarin County